KD Rencong is the fourth ship of Keris-class littoral mission ship. She was built for the Royal Malaysian Navy by China Shipbuilding and Offshore International Co. Ltd at Wucang Port, Qidong, Shanghai, in China. Rencong delivered in 2021 and commissioned in 2022 and will be in service with the 11th LMS Squadron based in Sepanggar, Sabah.

References

2020 ships
Keris-class littoral mission ships
Ships built in China